Jayasakti (r. 1146–51) was a king of Bali. He is known through his copper plate inscriptions, especially the Prasasti Desa Depaa.

He was a descendant of the famous ruler Airlangga.

See also
 History of Bali

Notes

References
 Andy Barski, Albert Beaucort and Bruce Carpenter, Barski (2007). Bali and Lombok. Dorling Kindersley, London. .

History of Bali
12th-century Indonesian people